Apache Lake is one of four reservoirs built along the Salt River in central Arizona as part of the Salt River Project.

Geography
The lake is located along the Apache Trail and about 16 miles east of Tortilla Flat, in Maricopa County, Arizona. It is about 65 miles (104 km) northeast of Phoenix.

Apache Lake is formed by Horse Mesa Dam impounded the Salt River, which was completed in 1927. The second largest of the four Salt River Project reservoirs, Apache Lake is located about 5 miles (8 km) downstream from Theodore Roosevelt Lake (the largest), and upstream from Canyon Lake and Saguaro Lake.

Recreation
Apache Lake is a popular recreation destination within the Tonto National Forest, which is the authority that manages the facilities located at the lake. The lake is located along the Apache Trail and a number of other hiking trails can be found in the area. Situated along Apache Lake is Apache Lake Marina and Resort, which offers visitors various amenities. The resort includes 3 motels, an RV park, a gas dock house, a restaurant and bar, wet and dry boat storage slips, and a general store. Apache Lake Marina and Resort is the only development along Apache Lake that offers motel rooms and campgrounds with full hook ups.

Many species of fish can be found in the lake, including largemouth, smallmouth and yellow bass, crappie, sunfish, both channel and flathead catfish, walleye and carp.

2022 fish kill has been caused by golden algae. 

See also
 Superstition Mountains
 Tonto National Forest

References

External links
 
 Apache Lake Marina
 Daily Water Level report from SRP
 Arizona Boating Locations Facilities Map
 Arizona Fishing Locations Map
 Video of Apache Lake

Reservoirs in Gila County, Arizona
Reservoirs in Maricopa County, Arizona
Superstition Mountains
Arizona placenames of Native American origin
Tonto National Forest
Reservoirs in Arizona